Sarge Steel is a detective/spy character published by Charlton Comics during the 1960s. As he was published during the time of Charlton's Action Heroes line of superheroes, and had loose ties to some, he is sometimes included with that group. He was purchased by DC Comics along with the other "Action Heroes".

Sarge (short for "Sargent" as in "Sargent Shriver") Steel has a mechanical left hand. As Dick Giordano stated in the editorial page of L.A.W. #4 he was created by Pat Masulli, and later written and drawn by Joe Gill and artist Dick Giordano. Other artists, including the team of Bill Montes and Ernie Bache, would later take over.

A variation of Sarge Steel appeared in live-action The CW's TV series Naomi, portrayed by Brian Brightman.

Publication history 
Sarge Steel first appeared in his own title, Sarge Steel #1 (December 1964). His title would last until #8, at which point it was retitled Secret Agent (Gold Key Comics also published a comic with the same title in 1967 based upon the television series, Danger Man), and cancelled with #10 (October, 1967). After that, his series continued in Judomaster #91-98 (the stories in #91-96 fit in the year-long hiatus between issues #9 & #10, as all his stories are listed as 'File #xxx'). Sarge also appeared in short spots on self-defense in Fightin' 5 #34 and 37 and in the Sentinels stories in Peter Cannon, Thunderbolt #57 and 58 as their CIA contact.

Fictional character biography

Charlton Comics version
Sarge was originally a hardboiled private eye (in fact, in the book The Fine Art of Murder, Max Allan Collins notes that Steel was the first fictional private eye to be a Vietnam veteran), who somehow also got involved in "spy cases" and became, by Sarge Steel #6, a "special agent".

Sarge Steel's enemies included characters like The Lynx, Ivan Crunch, Smiling Skull (a Nazi villain who fought Judomaster during World War II), Werner Von Wess, Mr. Ize, and others.

DC Comics version
In DC Comics, Sarge was eventually put in charge of the United States' governmental agencies involved with "superhuman" activities for many years. He was apparently the head of a small agency known as the CBI (Central Bureau of Intelligence), which also included King Faraday, and Faraday's two well known agents Richard Dragon and Ben Turner. He was eventually depicted as a Federal Cabinet Secretary of Metahuman Affairs (giving him control of agencies such as the Suicide Squad).

Around this time Sarge is sent in to investigate the country of Bialya. The entire place had re-opened, now a trendy vacation spot, after months of a media blackout. Sarge encounters Captain Atom, Major Force and the second Rocket Red as various attacks rattle the country.

Around this time, the manipulative, caterpillar-shaped alien criminal Mr. Mind is handed over to Steel's custody. Mr. Mind takes control of Steel, hiding inside his artificial hand to escape the detection of superhumans. Controlling Steel, Mind causes the nuclear devastation of the midwest American city of Fairfield. Though superhumans contained the bombs to the literal limits of the town, many thousands died.

Later, Lex Luthor would be elected as President. Luthor appoints Amanda Waller as his successor until Luthor was re-exposed as a criminal in the events of Superman/Batman: Public Enemies.

Steel has since resumed his old Cabinet posting as a member of the Horne Administration. He is currently in charge of Nemesis and Diana Prince as part of the Department of Metahuman Affairs. During his time at that post the villain Circe kidnapped Steel, tied him up, duct taped his mouth shut, locked him in a closet, and had him replaced with her shape-shifting henchman Everyman. Using Steel's pull at the agency, Circe and Everyman helped bring about the events of Amazons Attack.

In the end, Steel is freed, but he's left overtly suspicious over Wonder Woman's motives, questioning she may still serve the Amazons cause, to him perceived as harmful and dangerous. He correctly guesses the love story buddying between Nemesis and Wonder Woman, and so decides to keep Diana and Tresser in constant surveillance. 

Recently, he has been seen composing an essay accusing prominent female historical figures of being Amazonian spies. It is then revealed that since his kidnapping by Circe that Doctor Psycho has been tampering with his mind, enhancing his suspicious nature. Doctor Psycho eventually manages to switch bodies with Sarge Steel. He is then brainwashed into being a jester in a cage fight that Wonder Woman and Black Canary infiltrates. Diana uses her Lasso of Truth on him to remove the influence of mind control. Now remembering everything and understandably furious, he helps Wonder Woman and Black Canary capture a panicking Doctor Psycho, who is behind the illegal cage battles, to switch their bodies back and bring him to justice.

The New 52
Following the New 52 relaunch, Sarge Steel is re-introduced in the OMAC comic. Sarge Steel is an agent of Checkmate, and is put in charge of investigating the OMAC attacks at Project Cadmus when the sentient satellite Brother Eye goes rogue. Maxwell Lord sends him as the leader of a team of elite agents including Maribel and Little Knipper to hunt down OMAC, but their attempt to capture him fails. For this failure, Lord takes him off the assignment and sends Mokkari to take down OMAC instead. Sarge voices his displeasure when they call in S.H.A.D.E.'s top agent Frankenstein to do the job. In Checkmate's last battle against Brother Eye, Steel is called in again to lead his team against OMAC. They fight through Checkmate Headquarters in Mount Rushmore and Steel loses his hand in the fight.

Alternate versions
A much more antagonistic portrayal of the character appeared in The Multiversity chapter "Pax Americana". Steel takes part in a conspiracy against the United States President Harley as well as superheroes employed by the government (mostly Charlton heroes like Blue Beetle II, Captain Atom, The Question, Nightshade II, Tiger and PeaceMaker). Steel is revealed to be working for the corrupt Vice President Eden the two are involved in the assassination of President Harley as well as preventing his resurrection by Captain Atom.

In other media
 Sarge Steel appears in the animated film Batman and Harley Quinn, voiced by John DiMaggio. This version is an A.R.G.U.S. commander seeking Batman's help to stop Poison Ivy and Floronic Man.
 A character modeled after Sarge Steel named Commander Henry Steel appears in Naomi, portrayed by Brian Brightman. This version is Greg McDuffie's supervisor in the Unidentified Aerial Phenomena Task Force.

References

External links
Sarge Steel at Don Markstein's Toonopedia. Archived from the original on February 15, 2017. 
Sarge Steel Entry at International Superheroes
Sarge Steel @ Mister8.com

Charlton Comics characters
Charlton Comics titles
Charlton Comics superheroes
Cyborg superheroes
DC Comics cyborgs
DC Comics male superheroes
DC Comics military personnel
DC Comics titles
Fictional amputees
Fictional secret agents and spies
Fictional detectives
1964 comics debuts
Comics characters introduced in 1964
Fictional United States Army Special Forces personnel
Fictional soldiers
Fictional Vietnam War veterans
Hardboiled